Gavin Francis Keneally (5 October 1933 – 5 September 2020) was an Australian politician who represented the South Australian House of Assembly seat of Stuart from 1970 to 1989 for the Labor Party.

References

1933 births
2020 deaths
Australian Labor Party members of the Parliament of South Australia
Members of the South Australian House of Assembly